Orchelimum vulgare, otherwise known as the common meadow katydid, is a species of Orthoptera found in the central and eastern regions of North America. They are active from midsummer to fall.

Distribution and habitat 
Orchelimum vulgare is distributed across much of North America. They prefer fields and low meadows, where they perch on clumps of grass. They adapt best in moderate temperature climates, and cannot handle extreme heat or humidity.

Identification 
Orchelimum vulgare can be characterized by their red eyes, green faces, and a distinctly curved ovipositor. They have green bodies and brown legs that allow for them to camouflage themselves with their environment. Two black lines can be found on their dorsal shield.

Diet 
This species is known to consume a variety of plant species. It has even been recorded eating other Orthoptera.

Ecology 
Orchelimum vulgare like most katydids, functions as a food source for other organisms.

References

vulgare
Insects described in 1862